Struble is an unincorporated community in Ferguson Township, Centre County, Pennsylvania, United States.

The town was named after Conrad Struble, who owned a farm there which proved to lie over rich deposits of iron ore. Mining began in 1880. The Bellefonte and Buffalo Run Railroad graded a right-of-way from Bellefonte to the ore pits in 1883, but track was not laid until 1887, by its successor the Buffalo Run, Bellefonte and Bald Eagle Railroad. Even after the end of ore mining, Struble remained an important junction point on the railroad, now the Bellefonte Central.

Struble is bordered to the northeast by the borough of State College.

References

Unincorporated communities in Centre County, Pennsylvania
Unincorporated communities in Pennsylvania